Curtis Roads (born May 9, 1951) is an American composer, author and computer programmer. He composes electronic and electroacoustic music, specializing in granular and pulsar synthesis.

Career and music
Born in Cleveland, Ohio, Roads studied composition at the California Institute of the Arts and the University of California San Diego. He is former chair and current vice chair of the Media Arts and Technology Program at the University of California, Santa Barbara.  He has previously taught at the University of Naples "Federico II", Harvard University, Oberlin Conservatory, Les Ateliers UPIC (now CCMIX, Center for the Composition of Music Iannis Xenakis), and the University of Paris VIII.

He co-founded the International Computer Music Association in 1980 and edited the Computer Music Journal from 1978–2000. He has created software including PulsarGenerator and the Creatovox, both with Alberto de Campo.

Since 2004, he has been researching a new method of sound analysis called atomic decompositions, sponsored by the National Science Foundation (NSF).

The first movement of his composition Clang-Tint, "Purity", uses intervals from the Bohlen–Pierce scale.

Publications
 Roads, Curtis (2015). Composing Electronic Music. Oxford University Press. 
 Roads, Curtis (2001). Microsound. Cambridge: MIT Press. 
 Roads, Curtis (1996). The Computer Music Tutorial. MIT Press. 
 Roads, Curtis, Pope, Stephen Travis, Piccialli, Aldo and De Poli, Giovanni, eds (1997). Musical Signal Processing. Routledge. 
 Roads, Curtis and Strawn, John, eds (1987). Foundations of Computer Music. MIT Press.

Compositions
POINT LINE CLOUD (2005) @Asphodel (Excerpt @ youtube)
Half-life (1998–1999)
Clang-Tint (1991–1994)
nscor (1980)

References

External links
Artist page
Wired.com article by Eliot Van Buskirk Hear Curtis Roads’ Subatomic Pop Symphonies (May 5 2008), accessed 16 February 2010
moderecords.com profile
Asphodel artist page

20th-century classical composers
American male classical composers
American classical composers
21st-century classical composers
Living people
University of California, San Diego alumni
Harvard University faculty
University of California, Santa Barbara faculty
Oberlin College faculty
21st-century American composers
1951 births
20th-century American composers
20th-century American male musicians
21st-century American male musicians